The Boys' Doubles tournament of the 2013 Asian Junior Badminton Championships was held from July 10–14 in Kota Kinabalu, Malaysia. The defending champion of the last edition were Arya Maulana Aldiartama and Edi Subaktiar from Indonesia. Aldiartama this time teamed-up with Kevin Sanjaya Sukamuljo, and standing in the top seeds. The final turned into all-Chinese final after Li Junhui / Liu Yuchen faced their fellow countrymen Huang Kaixiang / Zheng Siwei in the finals that won by Li and Liu in straight games 21–15, 21–14.

Seeded

  Arya Maulana Aldiartama / Kevin Sanjaya Sukamuljo (semi-final)
  Choi Sol-kyu / Park Se-woong (third round)
  Darren Isaac Devadass / Ong Yew Sin (third round)
  Kim Jae-hwan / Kim Jung-ho (quarter-final)
  Tien Tzu-chieh / Wang Chi-lin (quarter-final)
  Arsya Isnanu Ardiputra / Yantoni Edy Saputra (second round)
  Li Junhui / Liu Yuchen (champion)
  Dechapol Puavaranukroh / Ketlen Kittinupong (quarter-final)

Draw

Finals

Top Half

Section 1

Section 2

Section 3

Section 4

Bottom Half

Section 5

Section 6

Section 7

Section 8

References

External links 
Main Draw (Archived 2013-07-13)

2013 Asian Junior Badminton Championships